The Kyrgyz State History Museum is a museum located in Bishkek, Kyrgyzstan. The museum contains literally thousands of exhibits about the cultural heritage of the Kyrgyz people, whose sculptures and objects date from antiquity to the end of the 20th century. It is one of the most important museums in Central Asia.

History 
During the 1920s and 1930s, one of the objectives was to complete certain ethnographic and archaeological collections, therefore, the construction of a museum to store different types of cultural and historical artifacts of Kyrgyzstan was proposed.   The museum was founded in December 9, 1925 as the first scientific institution in Kyrgyzstan. In 1927, the museum was first opened to the public, the museum has received several contributions from historians and ethnographers such as Aleksandr Natanovich Bernshtam.

In 1933, the name of the museum was changed to Museum of Local Customs. In 1943, the name of the museum was changed again to the Museum of National Culture. In 1954, it was renamed the State Historical Museum. In the 1960s it moved to a building constructed in 1928, this building was designed by the architect Zenkov. The current building where the museum is located was built in 1984. The construction of the building was intended to give the museum a distinctive design. It is located near the government house on Ala-Too Square.

In 2003, there was originally a statue of Lenin at the entrance of the museum but it was moved behind the museum, to a more secluded location.

The museum has several cave sculptures from the Bronze Age, as well as a series of collections of ancient coins and many ethnographic objects, jewelry and clothing from the 1st to the 5th century. Also, the museum contains various photographs and documents about the formation and development of the Kyrgyz Soviet Socialist Republic. The museum also houses exhibits on the migration of people in Central Asia. There is a typical handmade felted nomad yurt and mannequins dressed in typical clothing also. 

In 2016, renovation work began on parts of the museum funded by the Turkish Cooperation and Coordination Agency.

Gallery

References 

Museums in Kyrgyzstan
Buildings and structures in Bishkek
1925 establishments in the Soviet Union
History museums